Robert D. Goldman is an American cell and molecular biologist. He was the Chair of the Department of Cell and Molecular Biology at Northwestern University Feinberg School of Medicine and held the Stephen Walter Ranson Professor of Cell Biology at the institution. He is currently a Professor of Cell and Developmental Biology at Feinberg.

Education 
Goldman majored in zoology at the University of Vermont where he pursued an interest in how organisms interact with their environment. He subsequently also received his master's degree from the University of Vermont in Freshwater Biology and graduated in 1963. The title of his master thesis was "An investigation of growth-inhibiting substances produced by Kirchnerielle subsolitaria, a green alga."

Goldman pursued doctoral studies at Princeton University where he did research with Lionel I. Rebhun on understanding the sea urchin mitotic apparatus. Much of the work was conducted in Woods Hole, Massachusetts at the Marine Biological Laboratory. Goldman received his Ph.D. in biology from Princeton University in 1967.

Career 

Upon earning his Ph.D. in 1967, Goldman subsequently pursued post-doctoral research with in enzyme cytochemistry, cell biology, and cell culture at the Royal Postgraduate Medical School in London and the MRC Institute of Virology in Glasgow. In 1969 through 1973, he was an assistant professor of biology at Case Western Reserve University. From 1973 to 1981, we was an associate professor and professor of biological sciences at Carnegie-Mellon University. In 1981, he was named The Stephen Walter Ranson Professor at the Feinberg School of Medicine in Northwestern University and Chair of the Anatomy Department. The department was subsequently renamed the Cell Biology and Anatomy Department; the Cell Biology and Molecular Biology Department; the Cell, Molecular, and Structural Biology Department; and presently the Cell and Molecular Biology Department. In 2019, he stepped down as Chair, and remains a Professor in the renamed Department of Cell and Developmental Biology.

For more than three decades, Professor Goldman has conducted research on intermediate filaments in the cytoskeleton and the nucleoskeleton. He presently concentrates his efforts on molecular mechanisms that organize these intermediate filaments including their assembly and disassembly. He currently pursues research on vimentin and lamins.

Publications 
Goldman has published more than 400 publications on intermediate filaments.

He is the author of Live Cell Imaging: A Laboratory Manual.

Awards and honors 
MERIT Award, National Institute for General Medical Sciences, 1999-2009

Fellow of the American Association for the Advancement of Science, 1988

Ellison Senior Scholar Award in Aging, 2004

Elected president of the American Society for Cell Biology in 2008.

Elected foreign member Finnish Society for Sciences and Letters 2014

NIH Director Francis Collins made a video tribute to Goldman for a symposium celebrating his scientific career.

References

Living people
American molecular biologists
Northwestern University faculty
Princeton University alumni
University of Vermont alumni
1939 births